Conceptual engineering is a field in analytic philosophy that focuses on how to best assess and improve our conceptual schemes and repertoires. One of its key features is its normative agenda: conceptual engineers aim to prescribe which concepts we ought to have and use, instead of merely describing those we have and use. The most standard reference in the literature is to Rudolf Carnap's notion of explication as a precursory method of conceptual engineering for theoretical purposes.

Conceptual engineering can be understood in terms of its three components: design, which is about the normative improvement of our concepts; implementation, which is about the actual uptake of the prescribed concepts via advocacy strategies; and evaluation, which is about the quality assessment of our concepts along different dimensions (explanatory, epistemic, moral, etc.). Current work in conceptual engineering goes in two main directions. Case study research on the one hand, focuses on specific concepts and then advocates for specific ameliorations. Metaphilosophical research, on the other hand, explicitly theorizes conceptual engineering as a philosophical method and deals with its foundational issues.

A common objection to conceptual engineering argues that instead of revising and improving existing concepts, conceptual engineering creates new concepts incongruent with the old ones, and is thus philosophically irrelevant or merely changing the subject. One response to this objection is to take a functionalist view of conceptual engineering, such that so long as the new concepts serve the same function as the old concepts, conceptual engineering preserves the relevant subject matter and no problematic discontinuity obtains. Another response, invoked by Herman Cappelen, argues that the relevant continuity to be preserved in conceptual engineering is that of topics; as long as there is continuity in the topics our concepts address, Cappelen argues, there is continuity in our philosophical inquiry even as the intension and extension of concepts change.

References

External links 
 Supplement to Rudolf Carnap: D. Methodology at the Stanford Encyclopedia of Philosophy
 PhilPapers Entry on conceptual engineering
 YouTube Channel "Conceptual Engineering"
 ConceptLab – University of Oslo

Analytic philosophy